P108 may refer to:

 , a patrol boat of the Mexican Navy
 Boulton Paul P.108 Balliol, a British trainer aircraft
 Papyrus 108,  an early copy of the New Testament in Greek
 Piaggio P.108, an Italian heavy bomber
 P108, a a state regional road in Latvia